Doepfer Musikelektronik GmbH is a German manufacturer of audio hardware, mostly synthesizer modules (modular synthesizer), based in Gräfelfing, Upper Bavaria and founded by Dieter Döpfer. The product range covers analog modular systems, MIDI controllers, MIDI hardware sequencers, MIDI-to-CV/Gate/Sync Interfaces, MIDI master keyboards and special MIDI equipment.

Dieter Döpfer began developing audio hardware with a Voltage Controlled Phaser module for the Formant, a do-it-yourself-kit analog synthesizer from Elektor magazine in 1977. Several legendary modular synths followed while Döpfer also focused on the development of MIDI equipment during the 1980s. 

In 1992, Doepfer Musikelektronik GmbH released the MIDI analog sequencer MAQ16/3 which was designed in cooperation with Kraftwerk. In the beginning, the company had direct sales and interested musicians would receive a demonstration by visiting other customers since the modular systems were deemed too difficult for typical music shop employees to demonstrate. Facing greater publicity, Doepfer shifted the distribution to specialized points of sales.

Product History 

 1979 Voltage controlled phaser module for the German Formant modular synthesizer
 1980 PMS Polyphonic modular system (quad-modules, like quad-VCO, quad-VCF...)
 1982 Voice modular system (one synthesizer voice with 2 VCOs, 2ADSR, 1VCF, 1VCA on one board 100x160mm, designed with CEM chips from Doug Curtis/USA)
 1984 Sound Sampler (8 bit voltage controlled sampler with interface and sampling software for Commodore 64)
 1985 Loop option, compander and synthesis software for sound sampler (FM, Fourier, Waveshaping and so on)
 1986 MCV1 MIDI-to-CV interface (first version)
 1987 CCM Computer-controlled audio mixing console with computer-controlled faders (VCAs) and filters (VCFs), interface and software for Commodore 64 and Atari ST
 1989
LMK1 simple MIDI master keyboard
MMK2 MIDI keyboard (e.g. used by Kraftwerk live for the Pocket Calculator song)
MKC1/2 MIDI master keyboard controller (for combination with LMK1)
 1990
LMK3 MIDI master keyboard with piano touch simulation
LMK1V2 MIDI master keyboard (improved version of LMK1)
SX-16 16 voice MIDI expander
MBP1 MIDI Bass pedal
DMC-8 Drum to MIDI converter
MONA universal MIDI out interface
 1991
K2B 2 manual MIDI keyboard 
MPC128 MIDI program change unit 
MTG128 MIDI-to-Gate interface with up to 128 Gate outputs controlled via MIDI 
MTS128 MIDI-to-Switch interface with up to 128 MIDI controlled electronic switches (e.g. as MIDI-In interface for any non-MIDI-keyboard) 
 1992
LMK1+/LMK2+/LMK4+ MIDI master keyboard series with real hammer mechanics
GMX-1 GM compatible MIDI expander
MAQ16/3 MIDI analog sequencer (designed in cooperation with Kraftwerk)
 1993
MIDIM8 MIDI controller dimmer pack with 8 power outputs
MTP8 MIDI switchpack with 8 power outputs
MVP1 MIDI volume foot controller
 1994
LMK4+ MIDI master keyboard top model
MOGLI MIDI glove
MEG universal MIDI event generator
MTR128 MIDI to relays interface to control up to 128 relays via MIDI note on/off
MSY1 MIDI-to-SYNC interface
 1995
MS-404 monophonic analog MIDI synthesizer
TMK2 2 manual MIDI master keyboard
A-100 analog modular system
 1997
Schaltwerk MIDI pattern sequencer
MCV4 MIDI-to-CV interface
MSY2 MIDI-to-SYNC interface
 1998
Regelwerk MIDI fader box and pattern/analog sequencer
PK88 MIDI Keyboard (control keyboard especially for piano expanders)
MCV24 MIDI-to-CV/Gate interface (24 CV/Gate outputs)
 c.1999 Drehbank MIDI controller
 c.2000 Pocket Control MIDI controller
 2006
Thru-Zero Quadrature VCO
30/60dB Switched Capacitor Filter
A-100 Keyboard/Sequencer
 2010 Dark Energy Mono Synth
 2011 Dark Time Analog Sequencer
 2012 Dark Energy II Mono Synth

References

External links 
 Doepfer Home Page
 Sound on Sound review of Doepfer system, July 1998, by Chris Carter of Throbbing Gristle, archived from the original.
 Sound on Sound follow-up review of Doepfer system, December 2003, by Chris Carter of Throbbing Gristle, archived from the original.
 Sound on Sound review of Dark Energy mini-synth, January 2010, archived from the original.

Synthesizer manufacturing companies of Germany
Modular synthesizers
Musical instrument manufacturing companies of Germany
Companies based in Upper Bavaria